Uromyces trifolii-repentis var. fallens is a plant pathogen infecting red clover. Its first detection in Pakistan was in 1990 in the Kaghan Valley.

References

External links
 USDA ARS Fungal Database

Fungal plant pathogens and diseases